Kirakira Pretty Cure a la Mode is the fourteenth anime television series in Izumi Todo and Bandai's Pretty Cure franchise, produced by Asahi Broadcasting Corporation, Toei Animation. The series follows Ichika Usami and her friends who transform into Pretty Cures in order to protect the Kirakiraru residing in sweets from the evil Kirakiraru Thieves. The series aired on all ANN networks in Japan between February 5, 2017, and January 28, 2018, succeeding Maho Girls PreCure! in its initial timeslot and was succeeded by Hugtto! PreCure. From episode 23 to the final episode, a second ending theme is used called  by Miyamoto. Crunchyroll began streaming the series internationally in August 2020.


Episode list

See also
KiraKira PreCure à la Mode: Crisply! The Memory of Mille-feuille! - An animated film based on the series.
Pretty Cure Dream Stars! - The first Pretty Cure Stars crossover film, which stars the Kirakira Pretty Cure a la Mode.

Notes

References

Pretty Cure episode lists